Göran Lindblad may refer to:

 Göran Lindblad (politician) (born 1950), Swedish politician
 Göran Lindblad (physicist) (born 1940), Swedish physicist